Sunspel is a British garment manufacturer and retailer, founded in England in 1860. The brand is particularly well-known for its range of boxer shorts, T-shirts and polo shirts.

History
Sunspel was founded in 1860 by Thomas Arthur Hill, who established a textile factory in Newdigate, Nottingham (the centre of the British lace making industry).
Since 1937 the company’s UK manufacturing base has been at Long Eaton, in Derbyshire.
In 1947 Sunspel first introduced the boxer short from the United States into the United Kingdom.
In 2005 Hill’s great-grandson, Peter Hill, sold the company to a former barrister, Nicholas Brooke, and his then business partner Dominic Hazlehurst. The pair sought to modernise the brand, without losing the appeal of its historical heritage.

Notable products

T-shirts 

The earliest garments that Sunspel produced were tunics and undershirts, which were manufactured in their Nottingham factory at the height of the industrial revolution. They were amongst the very first T-shirts ever made.

Boxer shorts 

Sunspel introduced the boxer short to the UK from the US in 1947.

In 1985, a Levis advertisement saw English model Nick Kamen wearing a pair of Sunspel boxer shorts. This advertisement is widely attributed as being the moment that brought this underwear style to mass popularity in the UK.

Polo shirts 

In 2006, Sunspel designed a custom polo shirt for the James Bond film Casino Royale. The shirt was based on a classic 1950s Sunspel polo shirt, which was selected and updated by award winning stylist Lindy Hemming.

Recent developments
After the change in control of the company in 2005, the new owners focused at first on building its brand on the internet. However, since 2010 a number of Sunspel stores have opened worldwide – at first in London, where eight stores had been opened by 2022, and more recently in Berlin and Tokyo.

In August 2018, Sunspel announced the imminent opening of its first store in the United States, at 85 Mercer Street in New York’s SoHo district.

Film and media exposure
In 1985 Nick Kamen starred in a celebrated Levi's advertisement, in which he removed his jeans in a launderette, to reveal a pair of white Sunspel boxer shorts.

In 2006 Daniel Craig wore a Sunspel Riviera polo shirt in his first James Bond film, Casino Royale.

In 2016, the television football pundit Gary Lineker undertook to present the season-opening edition of Match of the Day in his underpants if Leicester City became Premier League Champions. He performed his promise in a pair of Sunspel boxer shorts.

External links
Sunspel official web-site

References

Clothing companies of England
Clothing retailers of England
Retail companies established in 1860
Clothing brands of the United Kingdom
Clothing manufacturers
1860s establishments in England
Manufacturing companies based in Nottingham